Cottari Subbanna Nayudu (18 April 1914 – 22 November 2002) was an Indian cricketer who played in eleven Tests from 1934 to 1952. He was the younger brother of the cricketer C. K. Nayudu.

Career

C. S. Nayudu played his first first-class match in 1932 when he was 17, and his last in 1961 when he was 46. He played 56 Ranji Trophy matches, representing eight teams and captaining four of them. In the 1942–43 Ranji Trophy tournament, he became the first bowler to take forty wickets in one season in India. In the final of the 1944–45 Ranji Trophy, he bowled a record of 917 balls in one Ranji Trophy match.

International career
Nayudu made his test debut in the test against England at Calcutta, 5–8 Jan 1934, and played his last test against England at Kanpur, 12–14 Jan 1952

References

External links

1914 births
2002 deaths
India Test cricketers
Indian cricketers
Hindus cricketers
Central India cricketers
Madhya Pradesh cricketers
Andhra cricketers
Holkar cricketers
Bengal cricketers
Baroda cricketers
Uttar Pradesh cricketers
East Zone cricketers
Cricketers from Nagpur
Cricketers from Indore